d’Overbroeck's is an independent, co-educational day and boarding school for students aged 11–18. The school is owned by Nord Anglia Education and is located in Oxford, England. It is made up of three school sites; Years 7-11, The International School and the Sixth Form.

History
d'Overbroeck's was founded in 1977 as a sixth form by Malcolm van Biervliet D'Overbroeck. He taught French and Spanish at the school for 30 years until 2007 when he retired. The college was first based at van Biervliet's house.

Years 7-11
d'Overbroeck's Years 7-11 is on Leckford Place in North Oxford. Students at Years 7-11 study a curriculum covering a full range of subjects in the Sciences, Humanities, Arts and Modern Languages. This also includes Music, Drama and Sport, both as curriculum subjects and as co-curricular activities.

The International School
The International School is located at 111 Banbury Road, in North Oxford. In 2020, the school had over 90 students from countries including the United States, Lithuania, Ukraine and Thailand. The International School currently offers five academic programmes to international students:

The Discovery Years (UK Years 7-9)
Two-Year IGCSE (UK Years 10-11)
One-Year IGCSE (UK Year 11)
4 or 5-Term IGCSE (UK Year 10)
UK Study Abroad (UK Years 9-10)

Approximately half of International School students continue on to study at d'Overbroeck's Sixth Form whilst others choose to go on to other UK schools. Some may prefer to go on to an IB programme, others may prefer a change of locations or a leading single-sex school for their sixth form studies.

Students
In 2020, Years 7-11 has approximately 200 students enrolled. The International School has over 90 students and the Sixth Form has approximately 375 students.

At the Sixth Form, approximately 50% of students are British and 50% of students join the school from countries across the world. Half of the school's Sixth Form students are boarders and half are day students.

Results
In 2020, d'Overbroeck's students achieved the following:

Years 7-11
68% grades 9-7
40% grades 9-8
19% grade 9

The International School
45% grades 9-8
62% grades 9-7
73% grades 9-6

Sixth Form
27% A*
65% A*-A
90% A*-B

Accreditation
d'Overbroeck's is affiliated to the Independent Schools Council (ISC). It is also a member of the British Boarding Schools' Association (BSA) and the Society of Heads (SHHIS).

Alumni
Rupert Friend, actor
Will Young, singer

References

External links

Educational institutions established in 1977
1977 establishments in England
Schools in Oxford
Private schools in Oxfordshire
Nord Anglia Education